Illinois Route 351 is a north–south state route that leads from Illinois Route 71 and Illinois Route 251 by Oglesby through downtown LaSalle to Interstate 80.

Route description 

Illinois 351 is the former Business U.S. Route 51 through La Salle. It crosses over the Illinois River on the Shippingsport Bridge south of La Salle and passes underneath the Abraham Lincoln Memorial Bridge as it climbs out of the Illinois River Valley. Like Illinois Route 251, Illinois 351 can be considered a spur off its parent, U.S. Route 51.

History 
Prior to 1963, US 51 originally traveled mostly along present-day IL 351. From 1963 to 1966, it became US 51 Business (US 51 Bus.) as US 51 was rerouted west of LaSalle along present-day Illinois Route 251. After 1966, it was then changed to IL 351.

Major intersections

References

External links 

Illinois Highway Ends: Illinois Route 351

State highways in Illinois
U.S. Route 51
Transportation in LaSalle County, Illinois